Woodside is a district in the Scottish city of Glasgow and also forms some of the most southern part of the much larger district of Maryhill. It is situated north of the River Clyde, between the River Kelvin and the Forth and Clyde Canal.

Woodside has the first and grandest of Glasgow's Carnegie libraries, which were all designed in the Edwardian Baroque style by James Robert Rhind. Joseph Connery, the father of Sean Connery, was born in the district in 1902.

Public transport links include Kelvinbridge and St George's Cross Subway stations.

Woodside is also home to many small to medium-sized businesses, including Breast Cancer Care and Abbey Business Centres.

The Stockline Plastics factory explosion happened in Woodside on 11 May 2004. Nine people were killed, including two company directors, and 33 injured, 15 seriously. The four-storey building was largely destroyed.

Gallery

See also
 Glasgow tower blocks

References

External links
 
 Woodside Community Council
 Woodside & Firhill - Illustrated Guide

Areas of Glasgow
Maryhill